Paruro may refer to:

 Paruro Province, Cusco region
 Paruro District
 Paruro